Marine Air Defense Command 1 (MADC-1) was a United States Marine Corps aviation command and control unit based in Okinawa, Japan. Originally commissioned in April 1944 as Marine Aircraft Group 62 (MAG-62), the higher headquarters for new PBJ squadrons that were training on the east coast of the United States.  In late 1944, MAG-62 was tasked with joining the 2nd Marine Aircraft Wing on Okinawa to serve as an additional headquarters element for all of the disparate forces that fell under the command of the Tactical Air Force, Tenth Army.  On August 15, 1945, MAG-62 was re-designated as Marine Air Defense Command 1.  MADC-1 was a short lived unit that was decommissioned on November 30, 1945, shortly after the surrender of Japan.

Mission
Organize and train both ground personnel and aircrew for Marine Corps PBJ squadrons.

History

World War II

Marine Aircraft Group 62
Marine Aircraft Group 62 was commissioned on April 1, 1944, at Marine Corps Air Station Cherry Point, North Carolina.  On August 3, 1944, MAG-62 was transferred under the control of the 9th Marine Aircraft Wing.  The group was responsible for overseeing the training pilots, navigators, radiomen, gunners, and maintainers for the newly formed Marine Corps PBJ bomber squadrons.  On November 8, 1944, Marine Aircraft Group 34 was assigned to MAG-62 for temporary duty.  The Group transferred 67 PBJ variants to MAG-34 on February 3 at the direction of Wing Aircraft Transfer Authority #13-1945.  MAG-62 departed MCAS Cherry Point on February 15 headed for Marine Corps Air Facility Newport, Arkansas arriving February 17.  At the time of the movement to MCAF Newport, the group consisted of a Headquarters Squadron, Service Squadron and one flying squadron, VMB-614.  On March 1, all Marine Corps SBD and SB2C aircraft at MCAF Newport were transferred to MAG-62.  These older model aircraft were then transferred to numerous other Navy and Marine Corps facilities throughout the United States.

On April 23, 1945, MAG-62, with Headquarters Squadron 62 as the only subordinate unit, detached from the 9th MAW and departed MCAF Newport headed for California to join Marine Fleet Air, West Coast.  The Group arrived at Port Hueneme on April 27 where it was ordered to join the 2nd Marine Aircraft Wing on Okinawa.  The Group departed Port Hueneme on May 5 via military shipping and arrived at Okinawa on July 2.  Upon coming ashore, a temporary camp site was established in the vicinity of Awase Airfield.

Marine Air Defense Command 1

On August 1, 1945, MAG-62 was re-designated at Marine Air Defense Command 1.  For most of August, the MADC-1 focused on the construction of its headquarters area, Camp William Wallace, in the vicinity of Awase Airfield.  The group was co-located with Marine Air Defense Command 2 on a hilltop just to the north of Nakagusuku Castle overlooking Nakagusuku Bay.  Both units worked together to coordinate the air defense of Okinawa through the end of the war.

Commanding Officers
Col Byron F. Johnson (April 1, 1944 - September 22, 1944)
Col Thomas J. Walker Jr. (September 23, 1944 - March 1, 1945)
Col Carl J. Fleps (March 2, 1945 - August 31, 1945)
Col William C. Lemly (September 1, 1945 - November 30, 1945)

Unit awards
A unit citation or commendation is an award bestowed upon an organization for the action cited. Members of the unit who participated in said actions are allowed to wear on their uniforms the awarded unit citation. MADC-1 has been presented with the following awards:

See also
 United States Marine Corps Aviation
 List of United States Marine Corps aircraft groups

Citations

References
Bibliography

External links

United States Marine Corps air control groups
Military units and formations established in 1944